Champion is a village in southern Alberta, Canada within Vulcan County.

History 

Homesteaders began arriving in the Champion area in 1904 and 1905, mainly from the US, Eastern Canada, and Britain. The vast prairie grasslands, cut through by the Little Bow River, provided ideal country for farming and ranching. One of these settlers was Martin G. Clever, who arrived in 1905. He homesteaded on the quarter section of land (160 acres) where the town of Champion is currently located.

The birth of the town was the product of the rapid settlement of the farming and ranching land in the area, but it was also fuelled by the discovery of coal. Homesteader Henry Therriualt opened the first coal mine in the area in 1906, and soon farmers were travelling from neighbouring towns (including Nanton and Stavely) to purchase coal from the Therriault mine. Their journey took them through the Clever homestead to reach the mine, and soon Martin Clever realized the business opportunity that presented itself.

Soon, a country store and a mail route were established. When the storeowner (George Mark) applied to have a government post office located, the burgeoning settlement required a name, and in honour of Martin Clever, Cleverville was christened. Several other thriving businesses soon sprung up, thanks to Martin Clever's offer of the free use of his land: Cleverville was soon home to three general stores, a millinery and linen shop, drug store, butcher shop, blacksmith shop, livery stable, restaurant, two real estate offices, lumber yard, Bank of Hamilton, and doctor's office.

In 1910 the Canadian Pacific Railway (CPR) reached the area, although it became apparent that the rails themselves would not run directly past Cleverville. As a result, the townspeople decided to move, using horses and skids and wagons, all of the buildings of the town to a new location closer to the railway. This new settlement required a new name, and so the relocated Cleverville became the new Village of Champion. Although there are several stories regarding how Champion got its name, the most likely (or at least the one most commonly retold) is that it was named after H.T. Champion, a banker in the Winnipeg firm Alloway and Champion, well-known bankers and loaners throughout the period of settlement of the west. The Alloway and Champion Bank in Winnipeg, Manitoba built in 1905 is on the Registry of Historical Places of Canada. When the town of Champion was relocated, so the story goes, a Winnipeg C.P.R. man named the town after the prominent banker.

The Village of Champion received its charter on May 27, 1911, and the first council meeting was held in June. The growing village required ever more services, and soon Champion was home to its first grain elevator (1912), a telephone office, a school (1913), recreational facilities, and an ever-growing number of retail shops and businesses. A local newspaper, The Champion Chronicle, was also started in 1918 or 1919, and remained in print until 1943.

Agriculture sustained the growth of the Champion area. In 1915 Champion became known as the "Million Bushel Town," as one million bushels of wheat were shipped that year. The Champion Board of Trade was eager to promote the village as a land of opportunity, and in 1913 published the promotional pamphlet "Grain Golden Champion," which was sent around the world to entice settlers and entrepreneurs to move to the area. Claiming that "of all the thriving towns and cities in Western Canada, destined to become the industrial centres of the future, none has established its position, or grown to such importance, in so brief a space of time, as Champion," the Board of Trade invited people to take up opportunities in, of course, grain farming, but also in poultry- and stock-raising, railway work, brick- and cement-making, and the development of the natural gas and coal resources in the area.

However, Champion wasn't the only western settlement claiming to be the city of the future, and its population peaked at around 650 people. Nevertheless, Champion continued to mature into a stable and close-knit village. The building of the Community Hall in the late 1920s was a particularly important moment in the history of the town, and the Hall continues to host a variety of community social events to this day.

Along with agriculture, coal mining was a particularly important economic engine for the area. After the initial discovery of coal by Henry Therriault, a number of mines were established. Between 1906 and 1965, when the last coal mine was shut down, there were 58 registered coal mines in the Champion area. In addition to these, there were numerous mines dug into the river or lake beds by families who used coal to heat their homes. Many farmers worked in the mines in the fall and winter months, when farming work was scarce and there was greater demand for coal to heat homes and businesses.

Agriculture remained, however, the most important economic activity for the town and surrounding area. By the mid-1920s there were seven grain elevators, such distinct landmarks for all prairie towns, in Champion. However, as grain handling procedures, as well as world markets, changed throughout the 20th century, Champion's wooden grain elevators, like so many throughout the prairies, became increasingly obsolete. Champion's last elevator was torn down in 2004.

Champion's population throughout the years has remained small but active. Sports formed an important part of community life, particularly through the heyday of the Champion Men's baseball team throughout the 1950s and 1960s. Social and cultural clubs such as the Lions Club, the Champion branch of the Royal Canadian Legion, 4-H clubs, Scouts and Girl Guides, and the Pioneer Club, provide the social backbone of the village and surrounding area.

Since its founding, the Village of Champion has celebrated its anniversary every five years, traditionally on the July 1st long weekend. In 2011 the town will celebrate its 100th anniversary, an important celebration for which planning has been underway for some years.

Demographics 

In the 2016 Census of Population conducted by Statistics Canada, the Village of Champion recorded a population of 317 living in 164 of its 185 total private dwellings, a  change from its 2011 population of 378.

Government 
The village is governed by a council consisting of a mayor and four councillors, and is administrated by a chief administrative officer.

Services 
Champion is home to two schools, the Champion Community School (70 students in grades 1–9, plus a parent-run kindergarten), and the Hope Christian School (grades K-12).

Recreational and cultural services in the village include the Champion Public Library, the Community Pool (outdoors), the Pioneer Club Seniors' Drop-In Centre, two baseball fields, the Champion Community Park and Campground, the Rodeo arena, the Royal Canadian Legion, and in the winter, a skating arena with natural ice.

Retail services and businesses in Champion include a restaurant/bar, a grocery/liquor/lottery store, a self-serve gas station, a thrift store, a bank, a post office, and various other locally owned businesses.

In terms of emergency response, the Village of Champion is served by the RCMP detachment and EMS services in neighbouring Vulcan, as well as the Champion Volunteer Fire Department.

The village has several churches, including St. Mary's Catholic Church, the Champion Congregational Church, and a local meetinghouse of the Church of Jesus Christ of Latter-day Saints.

See also 
 List of communities in Alberta
 List of villages in Alberta

References 

 Champion History Society, Champion and District, (Friesens Corporation, 1999).
 Champion History Committee, Cleverville/Champion, 1905-1970: A History of Champion and Area, (Friesen and Sons, 1977).
 Sev Pasolli, Coal: Champion's Black Gold: A History of the Coalmines in the Champion Coal Fields Area, 2006.

External links 

1911 establishments in Alberta
Populated places established in 1911
Villages in Alberta
Vulcan County